Centerville is an unincorporated community in Knox County, Illinois, United States. Centerville is served by Illinois Route 180.

References

Unincorporated communities in Knox County, Illinois
Unincorporated communities in Illinois